Jason Hann is an American percussionist and DJ.

Career
Hann is a member of a band called The String Cheese Incident.

He is a former member of the band EOTO. He released a solo album in 2005 called Rhythmsphere Vol. 1 - Djembe Furia. Hann also has an Electronic DJ side project known as Prophet Massive.

The roster of musicians he has worked or currently works with includes the following:
 SCI Fidelity Records recording artists The String Cheese Incident
 Live Breakbeat, House, Drum n Bass duo EOTO
 Boulder, CO based livetronica band Zilla (band)
 Grammy and Academy Award-winning soul legend Isaac Hayes
 Quinland Road recording artist Loreena McKennitt
 Grammy winning hip hop artist Dr. Dre 
 Grammy winning international artist Youssou N’Dour
 Multi Grammy winning artist Rickie Lee Jones - U.S. and Italy
 Multi Grammy winning gospel artist Andraé Crouch
 Multi Emmy winning composer Sam Cardon
 Sony Latin recording artist Marisela 
 Fusion guitar virtuoso Fareed Haque
 Columbia Recording artist Alana Davis
 R & B “Soul Man” Samuel David Moore (of Sam and Dave)
 Atlantic Records recording artists "Zoo People" - Horde Tour 97(west coast)
 Capitol Records artist Adam Cohen
 Putamayo artist Ricardo Lemvo and Makina Loca
 SCI Fidelity recording artist Keller Williams
 International artist Vinx
 Iranian artist Mansour
 Iranian artist Dariush
 Iranian artist Bijan Mortazavi
 Composer John Nau
 Higher Octave/Virgin artists Les Nubians
 Triloka Records Moroccan artist Hassan Hakmoun
 A440 Records jazz guitarist Brian Hughes
 Sounds True world music group Shaman’s Dream
 Narada Records world fusion group “Dumazz”
 Triloka Records Latin Rock Artist Charlie Bravo
 Virgin Records artist Ashley Maher
 Domo Records Jazz group "Native Vibe"
 Putamayo artist Jacqueline Fuentes
 World Percussion group “Swati”
 Cameroonian legend Andre Marie Tala 
 American rock guitarist Steve Kimock
 Zairean artist Dindo Yogo
 Guinean Kora virtuoso Prince Diabate
 Mali international artist Cheick-Tidiane Seck
 L.A. session composer/guitarist Greg Poree
 Central African (Zaire/ San Diego) soukous band "Bitoto"
 Ultra Kinetic Orchestra
 Traditional West African Percussion group "Khaley Nguwel"
 Traditional West African Percussion group “Fore- Fote”

According to his web site he has shared stages with Isaac Hayes, Loreena McKinnett, Dr. Dre, Youssou N’Dour and Rickie Lee Jones.

Personal life
Hann resides in the Los Angeles with his wife.

External links
Jason Hann's Homepage
EOTO MySpace Homepage

References

American rock percussionists
Living people
Year of birth missing (living people)
The String Cheese Incident members